

2010

See also
 2010 in Australia
 2010 in Australian television
 List of 2010 box office number-one films in Australia

References

2010
Australia
Films